Nikolai Vladimirovich Kuryanovich (19 June 1966, Tulun, Irkutsk Oblast) - Russian politician, nationalist, Director of the Irkutsk branch of the Russian State Trade-Economic University, deputy of State Duma 4 convocation (2003-2007), member of the Central Council of the National Socialist Movement "Slavic Union".

Kuryanovich is a former member of the Liberal Democratic Party of Russia. He was expelled from the party in2006 because of his participation in the nationalist Russian march demonstration.

Education
In 1983, Kuryanovich graduated with honors from a high school in Tulun. In 1987, he graduated from the Novosibirsk Higher Military-Political Combined Arms School.

Later, in 1998 Kuryanovich got a degree in Law from the Irkutsk State University. Moreover, in 2004, he finished the Higher Academic Courses at the Military Academy of the General Staff of the Armed Forces of Russia. Finally, in 2007, Kuryanovich graduated from the Diplomatic Academy of the Ministry of Foreign Affairs of the Russian Federation.

References

External links
 Николай Курьянович в Лентапедии
 Правозащитники требуют привлечь к уголовной ответственности депутата Курьяновича
 Политическое заявление депутата ГД РФ Курьяновича Н.В о вступлении в Славянский Союз в качестве члена Центрального Совета
 Националист Курьянович идет в президенты РФ, чтобы остановить предательство интересов русских
 Правозащитники ответили на открытое письмо депутата Николая Курьяновича
 ЛДПР изгнала Курьяновича
 ЛДПР не переживет исключения Курьяновича
 Сообщество о деятельности Н. В. Курьяновича в Живом Журнале
 Живой Журнал соратника Н. В. Курьяновича Евгения Валяева («Русский Образ»)
 Николай Курьянович о власти, выборах и политике — интервью журналу «Иркутские кулуары» (10 номер 2008 года)
 Kuryanovich's blog at LiveJournal

Russian nationalists
1966 births
People from Tulun
Diplomatic Academy of the Ministry of Foreign Affairs of the Russian Federation alumni
Living people
Liberal Democratic Party of Russia politicians
Fourth convocation members of the State Duma (Russian Federation)